Amireh (also Romanized as ‘Amīreh; also known as Amīrīyeh, Kūt-e ‘Omayr, Kūt-e-‘Omeyr, ‘Omeyr, ‘Omeyreh, Roḩeymeh, and Ruhaimah) is a village in Kut-e Abdollah Rural District, in the Central District of Karun County, Khuzestan Province, Iran. At the 2006 census, its population was 871, in 201 families.

References 

Populated places in Karun County